Purdy's station is a commuter rail stop on the Metro-North Railroad's Harlem Line, located in North Salem, New York.

History
In 1847, Issac Hart Purdy agreed to allow the New York and Harlem Railroad to build their main line through the community for one dollar upon the condition that they establish a station within the community for both passengers and freight. NY&H was acquired by New York Central and Hudson River Railroad in 1864. The decline of the railroads after World War II threatened the very survival of the station until a descendant of Purdy drove to New York City with a copy of the original contract in order to thwart a potential closing in 1955. At some point, a smaller station house was built along the Grand Central Terminal-bound which still survives to this day. 

As with most of the Harlem Line, the merger of New York Central with Pennsylvania Railroad in 1968 transformed the station into a Penn Central Railroad station. Penn Central's continuous financial despair throughout the 1970s forced them to turn over their commuter service to the Metropolitan Transportation Authority which made it part of Metro-North in 1983.

Work on adding an elevator began in 2022.

Station layout
The station has one eight-car-long high-level island platform serving trains in both directions.

Bibliography

References

External links
 

 Station from Purdys Road from Google Maps Street View
 Articles related to Purdy's Station (I Ride The Harlem Line)

Metro-North Railroad stations in New York (state)
Railway stations in Westchester County, New York
Former New York Central Railroad stations
Railway stations in the United States opened in 1847
Transportation in Westchester County, New York
1847 establishments in New York (state)